"Age of Loneliness" is a song by German musical project Enigma. The song was released as the third single from their second studio album, The Cross of Changes (1993), on 8 August 1994.

Overview
The song can be regarded as a remixed version of an earlier Enigma song, "Carly's Song", where the song was originally more laid back and goes at a slower pace. The vocals in the song are whispered by Sandra Cretu.

The haunting chant in this song is of Mongolian origin and has a tinge of Gregorian chanting in it. It is from the Mongolian traditional long song, "Tosonguyn Oroygoor", sung by Dechinzundui Nadmid. For the "Enigmatic Club Mix", the beat of the song was pushed up a notch and laced generously with beeps of morse code throughout the song. The morse code spells out "I love you". For the "Jam & Spoon Remix", the song starts off with a short and relaxing piano piece. Although included in the "Age of Loneliness" single, it is exactly the same one found in the "Carly's Song" single.

In the music video for the song, the scene is set in New York City and entirely filmed in sepia. People are seen floating through the air weightlessly but remain unseen by the surrounding people.

Sleeve
The background of the single cover is mostly white (or beige) and has a tarot card placed in the centre. The figure in the card might be seen as a wizard at first glance, but the person is actually a thin Santa Claus conjuring up toys. The number "7" which appears at the four corners of the card indicates that the song is the seventh track in The Cross of Changes.

Track listing
 Radio Edit – 4:14
 Clubby Radio Edit – 3:31
 Enigmatic Club Mix (128 bpm) – 6:23
 Jam & Spoon Remix (93 bpm) – 6:28
 Album Version – 5:19

Charts

References

Enigma (German band) songs
1993 songs
1994 singles
Song recordings produced by Michael Cretu
Songs written by Anne Dudley
Songs written by Michael Cretu
Virgin Records singles